The Green500 is a biannual ranking of supercomputers, from the TOP500 list of supercomputers, in terms of energy efficiency.  The list measures performance per watt using the TOP500 measure of high performance LINPACK benchmarks at double-precision floating-point format.

In 2022, Hewlett Packard Enterprise took the lead (then later in Nov. 2022 Lenovo took the lead, though with a much smaller Nvidia based system), with AMD-based systems (AMD CPUs and AMD GPUs) in the 4 top positions, with the top position over 50% more efficient than the previous year (Japanese) top position. And number two on the list (the current fastest on TOP500) is also over 50% more efficient than the currently most efficient (and much smaller) Nvidia-based system. No large Nvidia-based system make the top 10 positions of Graph500 (smaller ones in 7th to 10th, nor any longer any (small or large) ARM-based (Fugaku was at the top of the list in June 2021).

History
, an Appro International, Inc. Xtreme-X supercomputer (Beacon) topped the Green500 list with 2.499 LINPACK GFLOPS/W.  Beacon is deployed by NICS of the University of Tennessee and is a GreenBlade GB824M, Xeon E5-2670 based, eight cores (8C), 2.6 GHz, Infiniband FDR, Intel Xeon Phi 5110P computer.

, the Eurotech supercomputer Eurora at Cineca topped the Green500 list with 3.208 LINPACK GFLOPS/W.  The Cineca Eurora supercomputer is equipped with two Intel Xeon E5-2687W CPUs and two PCI-e connected NVIDIA Tesla K20 accelerators per node. Water cooling and electronics design allows for very high densities to be reached with a peak performance of 350 TFLOPS per rack.

, the L-CSC supercomputer of the Helmholtz Association at the GSI in Darmstadt Germany topped the Green500 list with 5.271 GFLOPS/W and was the first cluster to surpass an efficiency of 5 GFLOPS/W. It runs on Intel Xeon E5-2690 Processors with the Intel Ivy Bridge Architecture and AMD FirePro S9150 GPU Accelerators. It uses in rack watercooling and Cooling Towers to reduce the energy required for cooling.

, the Shoubu supercomputer of RIKEN outside Tokyo Japan topped the Green500 list with 7.032 GFLOPS/W. The then-top three supercomputers of the list used PEZY-SC accelerators (GPU-like that use OpenCL) by PEZY Computing with 1024 cores each and 6–7 GFLOPS/W efficiency.

, DGX SaturnV Volta, using "NVIDIA DGX-1 Volta36, Xeon E5-2698v4 20C 2.2GHz, Infiniband EDR, NVIDIA Tesla V100", tops Green500 list with 15.113 GFLOPS/W, while ranked only 469th on Top500. It's only a little bit more efficient than the much bigger Summit ranked 2nd while 1st on Top500 with 14.719 GFLOPS/W, using IBM POWER9 CPUs while also with Nvidia Tesla V100 GPUs.

Green 500 List

Historical development
Energy efficiency of top-ranked computers (gigaflops/watt)

References

Supercomputer benchmarks